Waldemar Nowakowski (born January 13, 1950 in Przemysław) is a Polish politician. He was elected to Sejm on September 25, 2005 getting 4170 votes in 5 Toruń district, candidating from Samoobrona Rzeczpospolitej Polskiej list.

See also
Members of Polish Sejm 2005-2007

External links
Waldemar Nowakowski - parliamentary page - includes declarations of interest, voting record, and transcripts of speeches.

Members of the Polish Sejm 2005–2007
Self-Defence of the Republic of Poland politicians
1950 births
Living people